Acceptable Risk is an Irish television crime drama series, broadcast on RTÉ, that first aired on 24 September 2017. Produced by Facet4 Media and Saffron Moon for RTÉ Television, Acceptable Risk stars Elaine Cassidy as Dublin-based Sarah Manning, whose husband Lee is murdered whilst on a business trip in Montreal. Filmed between Ireland and Canada, the first series, comprising six episodes, was broadcast during September and October 2017.

Subsequently, the series has been sold to the United States, where it made its North American debut on Acorn TV, and to the UK, where it debuted on Universal TV on December 6, 2018. Internationally, the series has been distributed by DCD Rights and Acorn Media Enterprises. Following strong viewing figures for the series, which opened with viewing figures of more than 380,000, Facet4 Media have since confirmed a second series is in development.

Detective Emer Berry, a character from Acceptable Risk appeared in the six part TV series Hidden Assets released in 2021.

Production
Elaine Cassidy said of landing the part of Sarah Manning; "[What really attracted me to the role] was that the full six episodes were written [at the time of being offered the part]. That might seem weird but it's the way things used to be, and it doesn't happen that way now." Angeline Ball said of her role as Emer Byrne; "My agent had pre-warned me that it wasn't glamorous but I thought that was even better, I really wanted a role like this. I tried to make her as bland as possible in terms of her looks and her life; she really has nothing going on other than work and finding the truth."

Writer and creator Ron Hutchinson said of his idea for the series; "I wanted to explore the impact of globalisation from the angle of those working for international corporations in a Dublin far from the tourist image of the city. It's a world which offers a high salary and a great lifestyle to those who are part of it."

Cast

Main
 Elaine Cassidy as Sarah Manning 
 Morten Suurballe as Hans Werner Hoffman
 Angeline Ball as Det. Sgt. Emer Byrne
 Lisa Hogg as Nuala Mulvaney 
 Geordie Johnson as Detective Dusquene 
 Paul Popowich as Lee Manning 
 Risteárd Cooper as Barry Lehane
 Lorcan Cranitch as Ch. Supt. James Nulty
 Rory Nolan as Morrice O'Hanlon

Supporting
 Catherine Walker as Deirdre Kilbride 
 Charlie Kelly	as Aidan O'Sullivan 
 Kate Moran as Anna Coyle
 Madeleine Knight as Mila Beck 
 Eddie Jackson as Cormac Walsh
 Dearbhla Molloy as Marie Heffernan 
 Adjoa Andoh as Margaret Kroll
 Gloria Cramer Curtis as Rose Manning 
 Elijah O'Sullivan as Eamonn Manning 
 Karen Ardiff as Bridget MacNally 
 Maria Tecce as Donna Welty 
 Ali White as Theresa Lehane

Episodes

Series 1 (2017)

References

External links

2017 Irish television series debuts
Irish drama television series
Irish crime television series
RTÉ original programming
Irish legal television series
English-language television shows